Rafael Gimenes da Silva (born 5 July 1993), commonly known as Rafinha, is a Brazilian footballer who plays as a defensive midfielder for Madureira.

Career

Kalmar FF
On 18 January 2019, Rafinha moved to Sweden and signed with Kalmar FF until 2022.

Return to Madureira
On 2 June 2021, Rafinha returned to Madureira.

References

External links
Rafinha at Kalmar FF

1993 births
Living people
Brazilian footballers
Association football midfielders
Campeonato Brasileiro Série A players
Campeonato Brasileiro Série B players
Campeonato Brasileiro Série D players
Allsvenskan players
Fluminense FC players
Avaí FC players
Macaé Esporte Futebol Clube players
Madureira Esporte Clube players
Kalmar FF players
Itumbiara Esporte Clube players
Brazilian expatriate footballers
Expatriate footballers in Sweden
Brazilian expatriate sportspeople in Sweden
Footballers from Rio de Janeiro (city)